This was a new event added to the ITF Women's Circuit in 2016.

Asia Muhammad and Maria Sanchez won the title, defeating Jessica Pegula and Taylor Townsend in an all-American final 6–2, 3–6, [10–6].

Seeds

Draw

References 
 Draw

Tennis Championships of Maui - Doubles